Tazeh Kand-e Qeshlaq (also Romanized as Tāzeh Kand-e Qeshlāq) is a village in Sarajuy-ye Gharbi Rural District, in the Central District of Maragheh County, East Azerbaijan Province, Iran. At the 2006 census, its population was 938, in 213 families. The village occupies an area of approximately 0.34 km^2.

References 

Towns and villages in Maragheh County